John David Penrose (born 22 June 1964) is a British politician serving as Member of Parliament (MP) for Weston-super-Mare since 2005. A member of the Conservative Party, he was the United Kingdom Anti-Corruption Champion at the Home Office from 2017 until 2022. He resigned on 6 June 2022 as the United Kingdom Anti-Corruption Champion due to the Boris Johnson Partygate scandal. Penrose is married to Baroness Harding, Chair of NHS Improvement and the former head of NHS Test and Trace.

Penrose previously served as Parliamentary Under-Secretary of State at the Department for Culture, Media and Sport from 2010 to 2012 and Lord Commissioner of the Treasury from 2014 to 2016. He was Minister of State for Northern Ireland from 2018 to 2019.

Early life and career
Penrose was born in Sudbury, Suffolk, on 22 June 1964. He was privately educated at Ipswich School and studied at Downing College, Cambridge, receiving a BA in Law in 1986. He received an MBA from Columbia Business School, New York in 1991.

He was a Bank Trading Floor Risk Manager at JPMorgan Chase from 1986 to 1990, then a management consultant at McKinsey & Company from 1992 to 1994. He was Commercial Director of the Academic Books Division at Thomson Publishing in Andover from 1995 to 1996, then Managing Director of Schools Book Publishing at Longman (Pearson plc), publishing school textbooks for the UK and parts of Africa. He was chairman of Logotron Ltd in Cambridge (also owned by Pearson). In 1998, he was in charge of research at the Bow Group - a UK-based independent think tank, promoting conservative opinion internationally.

Parliamentary career
Penrose unsuccessfully contested the seat of Ealing Southall in the 1997 general election, before unsuccessfully contesting the seat of Weston-super-Mare in 2001. He was elected in the same seat in the 2005 general election, defeating the Liberal Democrat Brian Cotter and he retained his seat in the 2010, 2015, 2017 and 2019 general elections. He served on the Work and Pensions Committee from July 2005 to January 2009, and in 2006 was appointed joint chairman of the All-Party Parliamentary Group (APPG) on Further Education and Lifelong Learning. In 2006 he was also appointed Parliamentary Private Secretary to Oliver Letwin MP and in 2009 was promoted to Shadow Minister for Business, Enterprise and Regulatory Reform.

After his re-election in 2010 and the formation of the coalition government, Penrose served as the Minister for Tourism and Heritage from 2010 to 2012 during which he wrote and implemented the Government's Tourism Strategy, removed licences on live entertainment sold the Tote bookmaker and protected the Lloyd's of London building with a 'Grade 1' listing.

Penrose returned to the backbenches in 2012. He wrote a paper (We Deserve Better) on how to give people a better deal on their utilities. Less than a year later the Prime Minister invited Penrose back to a Government role with a new position as Assistant Whip (HM Treasury), before he was promoted in February 2014 as one of the Lords Commissioners of the Treasury (Whip). In May 2015 he became Parliamentary Secretary for the Constitution, a role he held until July 2016.

He was opposed to Brexit prior to the 2016 referendum. Since the result was announced, Penrose supported the official position of his party as an advocate of leaving the European Union.

Penrose was a Minister of State in the Northern Ireland Office from November 2018 to July 2019.

He was appointed the Prime Minister’s Anti-Corruption Champion in December 2017, and then reappointed in July 2019. 

He came under criticism for voting to change lobbying rules in order to defend his Conservative colleague Owen Paterson, who had been found to have "repeatedly used his privileged position to benefit two companies for whom he was a paid consultant". One of the companies that Paterson was paid to lobby for, Randox, was awarded contracts from the Department of Health and Social Care during the pandemic. Penrose defended the government's issuing of such contracts to Conservative donors, associates and inexperienced companies. The High Court also ruled illegal the Prime Minister's appointment of Dido Harding, Penrose's wife, to Chair the National Institute for Health Protection, overseeing the Test and Trace initiative; the scheme cost £37bn which was allocated to Serco and other private companies, before it failed in its primary objectives.

In October 2020 he attracted media attention by suggesting that “chaotic parents” are to blame for sending their children to school hungry.

Penrose resigned as the Anti-Corruption Champion on 6 June 2022, the same day as the vote of no confidence in Boris Johnson. He said he could not defend "a fundamental breach of the ministerial code." He also confirmed he would be voting against Johnson in the vote of no confidence

Personal life
Penrose met Dido Harding (who was made Baroness Harding of Winscombe in 2014), only daughter of Lord Harding of Petherton, while both worked at McKinsey. The couple married in October 1995, and have two daughters. Penrose has his home in the Weston-super-Mare constituency and a flat in London. Harding is the Chair of NHS Improvement, former Chief Executive of TalkTalk Group.
 
In 2016, Penrose, who lives in Winscombe, North Somerset, caused some local controversy over the design of a proposed swimming pool complex at his home. Winscombe and Sandford Parish Council formally objected to the 'ugly and massive' design on the grounds it would harm local views. The Daily Telegraph reported that this was noteworthy as Penrose had argued in 2013, in a previous ministerial role, for greater protection of historic views, suggesting some of the finest urban views in the country should be listed like buildings. Ultimately, the district council approved the planning application and accepted the argument that an originally planned grass roof was not possible.
In May 2020, Penrose joined the advisory board of the think tank 1828 which has campaigned to scrap the NHS and replace it with a health insurance based system.

References

External links 
 
 Personal/Staff Twitter Account
 
 John Penrose MP biography at the site of the Conservative Party
 Guardian Unlimited Politics - Ask Aristotle: John Penrose MP
 Weston-Super-Mare Conservatives
 

1964 births
20th-century British businesspeople
21st-century British businesspeople
Alumni of Downing College, Cambridge
Conservative Party (UK) MPs for English constituencies
John Harding family
Living people
ManKind Initiative people
McKinsey & Company people
Pearson plc people
People educated at Ipswich School
People from Sudbury, Suffolk
Politics of North Somerset
Spouses of life peers
UK MPs 2005–2010
UK MPs 2010–2015
UK MPs 2015–2017
UK MPs 2017–2019
UK MPs 2019–present